Justin Briner is an American voice actor. He has provided voices for English-language versions of Japanese anime films and television series with Funimation. He is best known for his roles as Izuku "Deku" Midoriya in My Hero Academia, Mikaela Hyakuya in Seraph of the End,  Maki Katsuragi in Stars Align, Qwenthur Barbotage in Heavy Object, Alfonso San Valiante in Garo: The Animation, Luck Voltia in Black Clover, Kensuke Hanasaki in Trickster, Ichi in the game Cibele, Shō Kusakabe from Fire Force and Hanako/Amane Yugi from Toilet-Bound Hanako-kun.

Biography
Justin Briner was born and raised in Maryland. He has a younger sister, Hayley Briner. He attended the University of North Texas and studied theater prior to finding voice acting work. In 2015, he starred as the voice of Mikaela Hyakuya, one of the two main teenage orphans who turns into a vampire in the anime series Seraph of the End, which was released through Funimation's broadcast dub service. He voiced Elam, a boy who serves Arslan's main party member Narsus, in The Heroic Legend of Arslan. He voiced main protagonist Qwenthur Barbotage in the mech-themed anime show Heavy Object. A reviewer wrote on Anime UK News that she was impressed with the quality of the dub and that Briner and fellow voice actor Micah Solusod "have a lot to do with how instantly likably the characters come across, which helps carry the whole show".

In video games, Briner voiced Ichi, the love interest of the main character, in Cibele, an indie video game about developing an online relationship. Cibele won a Nuovo Award at 2016 Independent Games Festival, and made Briner's name known in mainstream news.

In My Hero Academia, Briner voiced the lead character Izuku Midoriya, a middle school student who was not born with superhero powers but lives in a superhero-based world, and is recruited to enroll in a school for superheroes. Alex Osborn of IGN described his performance as excellent and standout, while Tom Speelman of Polygon noted that he and his Japanese counterpart "nail the optimistic nerdiness and heroic attitude" with Briner "channeling a bit of Morty Smith for good measure". The series has run for six seasons, with Briner and fellow voice actor Christopher Sabat doing panels and interviews at anime conventions including Anime Expo and San Diego Comic-Con regarding their work on the show.

Briner has continued to voice lead and main characters in other anime shows. He voiced Alfonso San Valiante the crown prince in the first Garo: The Animation series, which Robert Prentice of Three If By Space described the English cast "a great lineup", in particular highlighting Briner. In 2016, voiced Lance in the anime adaptation of Puzzle & Dragons X, and Nasu no Yoichi in the alternate history anime Drifters. In the prison comedy Nanbaka, his vocal performance was described as "more awestruck and childlike" than that of the original Japanese counterpart.  Anne Laurenroth of Anime News Network found Briner's portrayal of Kensuke Hanasaki in Trickster helped prevent his pre-backstory character from getting overly annoying. Briner has also been involved in the production side as the head writer on the ADR script for Rio: Rainbow Gate.

In 2017, he voiced lead characters Haruki Mishima in Convenience Store Boy Friends, Tazuna Takatsuki in Hand Shakers, and Ernesti "Eru" Echavalier in Knight's & Magic. In the same year, he landed the lead role of Justice "Seigi" Akatsuka in Taboo Tattoo.

Filmography

Anime

Films

Web series

Video games

Notes

References

External links

 
 
 

Living people
American male video game actors
American male voice actors
Male actors from Texas
People from Denton, Texas
Twitch (service) streamers
University of North Texas alumni
Year of birth missing (living people)
21st-century American male actors